Georgia Claire Flipo, known professionally as G Flip, is an Australian singer, songwriter, producer, drummer, and musician from Melbourne, Victoria. They released their debut studio album, About Us, on 30 August 2019.

Early life and education 
Flipo attended primary school at Our Lady of the Assumption Primary School (OLA) in Cheltenham, Victoria and secondary school at Star of the Sea College in Brighton, Victoria, graduating in 2011.

Musical career 
Flipo has been playing drums since the age of nine, and percussion still forms a big part of their songwriting process despite now being a multi-instrumentalist.

They said that they "spent most of 2017 holed up in their bedroom writing and recording", having previously performed in various different Melbourne music acts as a session drummer and occasional backup vocalist.

In February 2018, they uploaded their debut single "About You" to Triple J Unearthed and that same day their track was premiered on Triple J. The song was officially released on 2 March 2018. Pitchfork named it "Best New Track" and the music video, filmed on their iPhone, was featured in YouTube's New Music Playlist. Pining international interest in their project, Flipo was subsequently invited to play their first ever solo show at SXSW in Austin, Texas the following month. Flipo's follow up track "Killing My Time" was released in May 2018.

In November 2018, Flipo was nominated for a J Award as Unearthed Artist of the Year and was the inaugural winner of the ARIA Emerging Artist Scholarship.

In December 2018, Flipo performed "Proud Mary" and "Blame It on the Boogie" at the ABC's "The Night is Yours" New Year's Eve Celebration 2018 at the Sydney Opera House, and their song "About You" was featured in Season 2, Episode 10 of The Bold Type.

In January 2019, "About You" polled at number 38 and "Killing My Time" at number 62 in the Triple J Hottest 100, 2018.

In July 2019, G Flip won Breakthrough Independent Artist of the Year at the Australian Independent Record Labels Association (AIR) Awards. Their debut studio album was released on 30 August 2019.

Flipo worked with Ariel Rechtshaid on their track "I Am Not Afraid". Rechtshaid noted to Rolling Stone that "G Flip is a phenomenal musician... [They're] a strong songwriter and [have] a very authentic voice, and [they] are a badass producer.”

In January 2020, "Drink Too Much" polled at number 6, "Lover" at number 58, "Stupid" at number 66, "I Am Not Afraid" at number 77 in the Triple J Hottest 100, 2019.

In 2021, Flipo performed in Troye Sivan’s live version of the song "In a Dream" playing drums in the video.

They released a new single about non-binary gender identity "Waste of Space", on International Non-Binary People's Day, 14 July 2022.

Other activities 
Flipo designed and released two sell-out collaborations with Crocs shoe manufacturers in 2020 and 2021. The shoe ranges included custom-designed "Jibbitz™ charms that adorn each pair were designed to represent little pieces of G Flip's life". Both ranges sold out in minutes.

Personal life
Flipo is openly lesbian. On 13 June 2021, Flipo came out as non-binary on Instagram. They use singular they/them pronouns.

Flipo has been an avid Collingwood Football Club supporter since birth and is an AFL Women's advocate. They performed at the MCG for the 2021 NAB AFLW Grand Final.

In May 2022, American actress Chrishell Stause revealed that she was in a relationship with Flipo.

Discography

Studio albums

Singles

As lead artist

As featured artist

Promotional singles

Notes

Other certified songs

Notes

Awards and nominations

AIR Awards
The annual Australian Independent Record Labels Association Awards celebrate the success of Australian independent musicians.

! 
|-
! scope="row"| 2019
| G Flip
| Breakthrough Independent Artist of the Year
| 
| 
|-
! scope="row"| 2020
| About Us
| Best Independent Pop Album or EP
| 
| 
|}

ARIA Music Awards
The ARIA Music Awards is an annual award ceremony event celebrating the Australian music industry. Flipo has been nominated for three awards.

! 
|-
! scope="row" rowspan="3"| 2019
| rowspan="2"| About Us
| Breakthrough Artist
| 
| rowspan="3"| 
|-
| Best Independent Release
|  
|-
| G Flip for "Drink Too Much"
| Best Video
| 
|}

J Award
The J Awards are an annual series of Australian music awards that were established by the Australian Broadcasting Corporation's youth-focused radio station Triple J. They commenced in 2005.

! 
|-
! scope="row"| 2018
| Themself
| Unearthed Artist of the Year
| 
| 
|}

MTV Europe Music Awards
The MTV Europe Music Awards is an award presented by Viacom International Media Networks to honour artists and music in pop culture.

! 
|-
! scope="row"| 2020
| Themself
| Best Australian Act
| 
| 
|}

Music Victoria Awards
The Music Victoria Awards are an annual awards night celebrating Victorian music. They commenced in 2005.

! 
|-
| 2019
| Themself
| Breakthrough Act of 2019
| 
| 
|-
|rowspan="2"| 2021
|rowspan="2"| G Flip
| Best Musician
| 
|rowspan="2"|
|-
| Best Solo Act
| 
|-
|}

National Live Music Awards
The National Live Music Awards (NLMAs) are a broad recognition of Australia's diverse live industry, celebrating the success of the Australian live scene. The awards commenced in 2016.

! 
|-
! scope="row" rowspan="2"| 2019
| rowspan="2"| Themself
| Best New Act
| 
| rowspan="2"| 
|-
| Live Pop Act of the Year
| 
|-
! scope="row"| 2020
| Themself
| Live Drummer of the Year
| 
| 
|}

References

External links
 

1994 births
Australian singer-songwriters
Australian pop singers
Future Classic artists
Lesbian singers
Lesbian songwriters
Australian lesbian musicians
Australian LGBT singers
Australian LGBT songwriters
Living people
Non-binary singers
Non-binary songwriters
Singers from Melbourne
20th-century LGBT people
21st-century LGBT people
People from St Kilda, Victoria
People educated at Star of the Sea College, Melbourne